Gareth Owen is a former professional rugby league footballer who played in the 1970s and 1980s.

International honours
Gareth Owen won caps for Wales while at Oldham in 1981 against France (interchange/substitute), and England (interchange/substitute).

References

External links
Statistics at orl-heritagetrust.org.uk

Living people
Oldham R.L.F.C. players
Place of birth missing (living people)
Rugby league props
Wales national rugby league team players
Welsh rugby league players
Year of birth missing (living people)